Tsutsui Station (筒井駅) is a railway station in Yamatokōriyama, Nara Prefecture, Japan. It is on the Kintetsu Kashihara Line.

Lines 
 Kintetsu Railway
 Kashihara Line

Platforms and tracks 
The station has two side platforms serving one track each.

History
 1922—Tsutsui Station was opened on the Unebi Line by the Osaka Electric Tramway.
 1941—Owned by the Kansai Express Railway that merged with the Sangu Express Railway.
 1944—Owned by the Kintetsu Railway that merged with the Nankai Railway
 1977—The station was converted to an elevated station.
 Apr. 1, 2007—PiTaPa, a reusable contactless stored value smart card, has been available.

External links
 

Railway stations in Nara Prefecture